Brigada is a Philippine television investigative journalism program broadcast by GMA News TV and GTV. Originally hosted by Jessica Soho, it premiered on GMA News TV on February 28, 2011. In February 2021, GMA News TV was rebranded as GTV, with the show being carried over. Kara David currently serves as the host.

Hosts
 Kara David 

Former host
 Jessica Soho

Production
The production was halted in March 2020 due to the enhanced community quarantine in Luzon caused by the COVID-19 pandemic. The show resumed its programming on September 19, 2020.

Accolades

References

External links
 
 

2011 Philippine television series debuts
Filipino-language television shows
GMA Integrated News and Public Affairs shows
GMA News TV original programming
GTV (Philippine TV network) original programming
Philippine documentary television series
Television productions suspended due to the COVID-19 pandemic